Bob Crowe may refer to:

 Bob Crow (1961–2014), British trade union leader
 Bob Crowe (footballer) (born 1936), former Australian rules footballer

See also
Robert Crowe (disambiguation)